Jalyn Hall (born December 23, 2006) is an American actor best known for his role as Dillon James on All American and was cast as Emmett Till in the 2022 biographical film Till.

Early life
Hall was born and raised in Atlanta, Georgia.

Career
In 2018, Hall was cast as Dillon James in the tv series All American.

In 2021, when Hall auditioned for a role in Till, he was not told that the project was about Emmett Till until his second audition. In preparation for filming, Hall met with Till's relatives in Georgia prior to filming. The film premiered in October 2022.

Personal life
Hall's family divides their time between Los Angeles and Georgia.

Filmography

Awards and nominations

References

External links 

 
 

Living people
21st-century American male actors
American male television actors
African-American male actors
American male film actors
American male child actors
Male actors from Atlanta
2006 births